or  is one of the longest rivers in Trøndelag county, in the central part of Norway. The river is the namesake for the whole Namdalen region. The river traditionally has been used for floating timber down from the forests to the town of Namsos, where the sawmills were located. Today, parts of the Namsen are regulated by several dams.

Location

The river begins in springs in Børgefjell National Park, just over the border in Nordland county.  This water feeds the large lake Store Namsvatnet.  The Namsen river itself starts when the water passes through the dam on the northwest side of the lake Namsvatnet in the municipality of Røyrvik.

The river then travels through the Namdalen valley towards the coast, ending at the town of Namsos where it flows into the Namsenfjorden, the same fjord into which the smaller river Årgårdselva flows.  There are two major tributaries to the Namsen: Tunnsjøelva and Sanddøla.

Fishing
The Namsen is considered one of the best Atlantic Salmon fishing rivers in the world, and is often called the "Queen of Rivers". Beginning in the 19th century, the British found the Atlantic salmon fishing to be excellent here, and the river became a major tourist attraction. Catches above  are not unusual. The Namsen is a wide river and is thus often fished from small boats using a method called "harling".  This method consists of trolling a lure while the boat moves slowly from bank to bank and drifting downstream.  Thus, the salmon meet the lure as they swim upstream.

See also
Kraftverkene i Øvre Namsen
The Norwegian Sawmill museum

References

External links

Salmon with a weight of 25 kg caught in June 2009 
Upper Namsen Fishing

Rivers of Trøndelag
Namsos
Overhalla
Grong
Namsskogan
Røyrvik
Rivers of Norway